"Det rår vi inte för" is a song by Swedish rapper, songwriter and actor of Iranian origin Behrang Miri featuring the vocals of Victor Crone. The song is taking part in Melodifestivalen 2015 and qualified to Andra Chansen (Second Chance) round through the first semi-final on 7 February 2015. where it was put in a duel with Samir & Viktor song "Groupie", but failed to move on to the finals of the competition.

References

2015 songs
2015 singles
Melodifestivalen songs of 2015
Swedish-language songs
Behrang Miri songs
Songs written by Måns Zelmerlöw
Songs written by Tony Nilsson